The Sonoma chipmunk (Neotamias sonomae) is a species of rodent in the squirrel family Sciuridae. It is endemic to northwestern California in the United States. Members of Neotamias are characterized by having 2 premolars. N. sonomae has 2 subspecies: N. s. alleni and N. s. sonomae.

Distribution 
The Sonoma chipmunk is only found in California, north of the San Francisco Bay. Most of its range is within Sonoma and Marin counties.

Habitat 
Sonoma chipmunks are found in areas of forest or chaparral. They can be found in forests of sticky laurel, Ponderosa pine, Douglas fir, spruce, redwood, and black oak. They are generally associated with coniferous forests. The chaparral that Sonoma chipmunks inhabit is characterized by sagebrush plains. Sonoma chipmunks are found in elevations from 0 to 1800 m. These chipmunks typically live on the ground and make burrows in the ground, but they can climb and may make nests in trees.

Physical characteristics 
The Sonoma chipmunk has a total body length (including tail) ranging from 220-264mm. Tail length ranges from 100-126mm, hind foot (pes) length is 34-39mm, and ear flap (pinna) length is 15-19mm. These chipmunks have 5 black/brown stripes running the length of their body with white stripes in between. The rest of the dorsal and ventral parts of the body range from tawny to cinnamon to gray. The tail is edged in white. The belly is grayish white. Sonoma chipmunks have 2 molts per year, having a summer and winter pelage. The winter pelage is generally slightly darker and duller than the summer pelage. N. s. alleni is smaller and darker than N. s. sonomae. There is no distinct sexual dimorphism.

There are 2 other species of chipmunks found in the geographic range of the Sonoma chipmunk: the yellow-pine chipmunk and the Townsend's chipmunk. The yellow-pine chipmunk will be smaller and less reddish than N. sonomae and will lack a white-edged tail. N. sonomae can be distinguished from the Townsend's chipmunk by having longer ears, tail, and legs, being paler, and having a bushier tail.

The skulls of Sonoma chipmunks have the distinct post orbital process that is found in all sciurids. The skull has a deep rostrum, a long braincase, and small incisive foramina. The incisors are curved and pincer-like, and the molars are simple and cuspidate.

Diet and behavior 
Sonoma chipmunks typically forage on the ground or climb along small branches in brush. They eat seeds, fruits, herbs, buds of woody plants, as well as insects and bird eggs. Food is collected in their cheek pouches and stored in their burrows. These chipmunks will find elevated places to eat and rest so they can watch the surrounding area for predators. Sonoma chipmunks have high-pitched, bird-like alarm calls that are distinct from other chipmunks and are emitted in response to potential threats. Females are usually the ones to make alarm calls. These alarm calls likely evolved due to kin selection, as the chipmunks nearby that hear the alarm calls are typically related to the individual making the alarm call. When an alarm call is heard, the chipmunk will quickly move along a direct path to a covered, protected area and become still. These chipmunks undergo torpor in winter but arise periodically to eat from their food cache, since they do not accumulate fat stores.

Reproduction 
Sonoma chipmunks breed once per year, anywhere from February to July, but most often in April to May. There is occasionally a second breeding season for females if their first litter is lost. Gestation lasts for 28–36 days. 3-5 young are produced per litter, but it is usually 4. The babies are weaned after approximately 3 weeks, and the mother stops associating with them after they are weaned. The juveniles stay together for a few more weeks after their mother leaves. After this, the juveniles disperse. Males disperse in a larger range than females. Juveniles reach sexual maturity within one year, and the lifespan of these chipmunks is around 64 months. Females have higher survivorship and live longer than males. There is a 1:1 ratio of males to females when the juveniles disperse in spring. By the end of the year, this ratio favors females due to the higher risk of mortality in the wider ranging males. However, the ratio again becomes 1:1 by the fall of their second year of life, as first-year adult females have a high risk of mortality during their first breeding attempt. Over time, the ratio will once again favor females.

References

External links

Neotamias
Endemic fauna of California
Mammals of the United States
Chipmunk, Panamint
Fauna of the San Francisco Bay Area
Natural history of the California Coast Ranges
Natural history of Sonoma County, California
Mammals described in 1915
Taxa named by Joseph Grinnell
Taxonomy articles created by Polbot